Randall County is a county located in the U.S. state of Texas. As of the 2020 census, its population was 140,753. Its county seat is Canyon. The county was created in 1876 and later organized in 1889. It is named for Horace Randal, a Confederate brigadier general killed at the Battle of Jenkins Ferry. The reason the county name differs from his is because the bill creating the county misspelled Randal's name.

Randall County, alongside adjacent Potter County is part of the Amarillo Metropolitan Statistical Area.

At one time, the large JA Ranch, founded by Charles Goodnight and John George Adair, which reached into six counties, held acreage in Randall County.

Geography

Palo Duro Canyon, the second-largest canyon in the United States, is located in Randall County.

Major highways
  Interstate 27
  U.S. Highway 60
  U.S. Highway 87
  State Highway 217
  Loop 335

Adjacent counties
 Potter County (north)
 Oldham County (northwest)
 Armstrong County (east)
 Carson County (northeast)
 Swisher County (south)
 Briscoe County (southeast)
 Castro County (southwest)
 Deaf Smith County (west)

National protected area
 Buffalo Lake National Wildlife Refuge

Demographics

Note: the US Census treats Hispanic/Latino as an ethnic category. This table excludes Latinos from the racial categories and assigns them to a separate category. Hispanics/Latinos can be of any race.

As of the census of 2000,  104,312 people, 41,240 households, and 28,785 families resided in the county.  The population density was 114 people per square mile (44/km2).  The 43,261 housing units averaged 47 per square mile (18/km2).  The racial makeup of the county was 90.44% White, 1.50% Black or African American, 0.65% Native American, 1.03% Asian, 0.03% Pacific Islander, 4.71% from other races, and 1.64% from two or more races.  About 10.3% of the population were Hispanic or Latino of any race.

Of the 41,240 households, 33.90% had children under the age of 18 living with them, 57.50% were married couples living together, 9.20% had a female householder with no husband present, and 30.20% were not families; 25.40% of all households were made up of individuals, and 8.50% had someone living alone who was 65 years of age or older.  The average household size was 2.49, and the average family size was 3.00.

In the county, the population was distributed as 26.10% under the age of 18, 11.20% from 18 to 24, 28.40% from 25 to 44, 22.40% from 45 to 64, and 11.90% who were 65 years of age or older.  The median age was 35 years. For every 100 females, there were 94.70 males.  For every 100 females age 18 and over, there were 91.20 males.

The median income for a household in the county was $42,712, and for a family was $52,420. Males had a median income of $36,333 versus $25,358 for females. The per capita income for the county was $21,840.  About 5.70% of families and 8.10% of the population were below the poverty line, including 8.50% of those under age 18 and 6.60% of those age 65 or over.

Politics
Although once more Democratic-leaning, the county has become solidly Republican. The Republican candidate has carried the county in every presidential election since 1952, usually by overwhelming margins. In the last thirteen elections, no Republican candidate has received less than 61% of the county's vote, and since 2000, Randall has been the nation's most Republican "metropolitan" county outside of predominantly Mormon counties in Utah.

Randall County was one of the more than 200 counties in Texas to cast the majority of its votes for Republican John McCain. McCain received 41,895 votes, which was 81% of the total, while Democrat Barack Obama received 9,461 votes, or 18% of the total, far below his national percentage.

Communities

Cities
 Amarillo (partly in Potter County)
 Canyon (county seat)

Towns
 Happy (mostly in Swisher County)

Villages
 Lake Tanglewood
 Palisades
 Timbercreek Canyon

Unincorporated communities
 Ogg
 Umbarger
 Zita

Ghost towns
 Cita

Education
School districts include:
 Amarillo Independent School District
 Bushland Independent School District
 Canyon Independent School District
 Happy Independent School District
 Wildorado Independent School District

All of the county is in the service area of Amarillo College.

See also

 National Register of Historic Places listings in Randall County, Texas
 Recorded Texas Historic Landmarks in Randall County

References

External links
 Randall County government’s website
 Randall County TX Genealogy
 Randall County in Handbook of Texas Online at the University of Texas
 Historic Randall County materials, hosted by the Portal to Texas History.
 http://www.city-data.com/county/Randall_County-TX.html
 Randall County Profile from the Texas Association of Counties
 List of museums in the Texas Panhandle
 National Register of Historic Places listings in Randall County, Texas
Texas State Historical Association | Randall County (tshaonline.org)

 
1889 establishments in Texas
Populated places established in 1889
Texas Panhandle